An advertising ID is a unique user ID assigned to a mobile device (smart phone, tablet computer), or operating environment, to help advertising services personalize their offers.
It can be sent to advertisers and other third parties which can use this unique ID to track the user's movements, habits, and usages of applications. There is a potential for such technology to replace magic cookies.

Implementations 

 Apple calls their advertising ID the "Identifier for Advertisers" (IDFA). Beginning with its iOS 14.5 software update, Apple will allow its users to choose whether to allow apps to track their IDFA.
 Google calls their "Google Advertising ID" (AAID).
 Microsoft uses a similar technology, also called Advertising ID, that is generated for each  device and user. In Windows 10 & 11, it can be turned off in the settings panel.

See also

References 

Adware
Mobile technology
Tracking
Apple Inc.
Google